The untitled Toho Godzilla film, under the working title , is an upcoming Japanese kaiju film directed and written by Takashi Yamazaki, with visual effects by Yamazaki. Co-produced by Robot Communications and Toho Studios; it is the 37th film in the Godzilla franchise, the 33rd Godzilla film produced by Toho, the fifth film in the franchise's Reiwa era and the second live-action film thereof. The film is scheduled to be theatrically released in Japan on November 3, 2023, to commemorate the franchise's 69th anniversary.

Premise
The film will take place in post-war Japan, between 1945 and 1947.

Production

Development
Robot Communications announced the film, under the working title Blockbuster Monster Movie, on February 18, 2022, through a casting call on their official website. Robot stated Takashi Yamazaki would direct and that the film will be presented by Toho. Shirogumi opened a recruiting call for VFX designers and compositors in August 2022. Toho announced the project to be a Godzilla film on November 3, 2022, the franchise's 68th anniversary known as "Godzilla Day." Toho also revealed that the film had completed filming and had entered post-production with a targeted release date of November 3, 2023. Yamazaki was also named the film's writer and visual effects director.

Filming
Principal photography began in mid-March 2022, taking place in Kantō and wrapped in mid-June.

Post-production
In August 2022, Shirogumi revealed that post-production was scheduled to commence in August 2022 and conclude in January 2023. However, their site noted that the starting date was "negotiable".

References

External links
 

2020s Japanese films
2020s Japanese-language films
2020s monster movies
Godzilla films
2023 science fiction action films
2023 science fiction films
Films directed by Takashi Yamazaki
Toho films
Kaiju films
Giant monster films
Toho tokusatsu films